Kenneth William Yao (born 5 September 1998) is an Ivorian professional footballer who plays as a defender for Lewes.

Career
Originating from Ivory Coast, Yao signed his first professional contract with Charlton Athletic in May 2016 and went onto make his first-team debut during their EFL Cup tie against AFC Wimbledon, featuring for the entire 90 minutes in the 2–2 draw.

On 17 September 2018, Yao joined Dartford on loan until 20 October 2018.

On 2 July 2020, it was confirmed that Yao had left Charlton after his contract expired.

In the summer of 2021 he  joined Isthmian League Premier Division side on a free transfer.

Career statistics

References

1998 births
Living people
Ivorian footballers
Association football defenders
Charlton Athletic F.C. players
Dartford F.C. players
Lewes F.C. players
National League (English football) players
Isthmian League players
Ivorian expatriate footballers
Expatriate footballers in England